Canberra Glassworks is an Australian gallery in Canberra and glass art studio open to the general public to view the glass artists working. Opened in May 2007 by Jon Stanhope, it is the largest dedicated glass studio facility in Australia.

Planning and building 
It is located in the Kingston Powerhouse which was designed by John Smith Murdoch, constructed from 1913-1915, and is a historical landmark.  The power station generated electricity until 1957 and is Canberra's oldest public building. Particular effort was made to preserve the original building and surroundings where possible, and was developed within a framework of Ecologically Sustainable Design (ESD). artsACT and Jon Stanhope, Canberran Chief Minister and Minister for the Arts announced the name of the centre in late 2005, specifically to highlight 'Canberra' as a being potentially well reputed both nationally and internationally for studio glass and the term 'glassworks' to be clear about what equipment and facilities where available at the centre to artists as well as to the general public. The centre is strongly linked with the ANU School of Art Glass Workshop, whose founding workshop head Klaus Moje was pivotal in establishing the centre. The centre was originally scheduled to be opened in September 2006, but was opened in May 2007. The creation of Glassworks and renovation of this building is part of the redevelopment of the lake foreshore surrounding Kingston.

Public outreach 
The studio contains a public viewing gallery above the main hotshop areas as well as public access walkways around all glass working areas. Glassworks also offers courses to non-practicing artists and members of the public, as well as students. The studio also offers members of the general public to commission works through artists working at the studio. In addition there are rotating art displays featuring multiple different styles of glassworking.

Photos

Notes

External links

 Glassworks at artsACT website
 ANU School of Art Glass Workshop
 ANU Glass Australia Database

Museums in Canberra
Art museums and galleries in Australia
2007 establishments in Australia
Art galleries established in 2007
Glass museums and galleries